Diego González Montero Justiniano was interim Royal Governor of Chile twice, from February to May 1662 following the death of Pedro Porter Casanate and again from February to October 1670 succeeding the Diego Dávila, 1st Marquis of Navamorcuende until the arrival of Juan Henríquez de Villalobos.

Sources

Royal Governors of Chile
Spanish soldiers
Year of death unknown
Year of birth unknown